Andrey Minashkin (born 8 June 1976) is a Russian cyclist. He competed in the men's team pursuit at the 2004 Summer Olympics.

References

External links
 

1976 births
Living people
Russian male cyclists
Olympic cyclists of Russia
Cyclists at the 2004 Summer Olympics
Cyclists from Moscow